Narthecusa is a genus of moths in the family Geometridae erected by Francis Walker in 1862.

Species
Narthecusa perplexata (Walker, 1862)
Narthecusa tenuiorata Walker, 1862

References

Ennominae